Anopheles franciscanus is a species of mosquito in the family Culicidae.  This species has been collected in southern California.

Subspecies
These seven subspecies belong to the species Anopheles franciscanus:
 Anopheles franciscanus bifoliata Osorno-m. & Munoz-s., 1948
 Anopheles franciscanus franciscanus Mc Cracken, 1904
 Anopheles franciscanus levicastilloi Levi-castillo, 1944
 Anopheles franciscanus neghmei Mann, 1950
 Anopheles franciscanus noei Mann, 1950
 Anopheles franciscanus patersoni Alvarado & Heredia, 1947
 Anopheles franciscanus rivadeneirai Levi-castillo, 1945

References

franciscanus
Articles created by Qbugbot
Insects described in 1904